The 1970 NCAA Men's Soccer Tournament was the twelfth organized men's college soccer tournament by the National Collegiate Athletic Association, to determine the top college soccer team in the United States. The Saint Louis Billikens won their eighth national title, and second title in a row, by defeating the UCLA Bruins in the championship game, 1–0. The final match was played on December 5, 1970, in Edwardsville, Illinois.

Bracket

Final

See also
 1970 NAIA Soccer Championship

References 

Championship
NCAA Division I Men's Soccer Tournament seasons
NCAA
NCAA University Division Soccer Tournament
NCAA University Division Soccer Tournament